Eduardo Fabián Lillingston García (born 23 December 1977 in Guadalajara) is a Mexican former professional footballer, who last played for Necaxa in Ascenso MX.

Career

Club
Lillingston has spent the majority of his career playing for various Primera División (First Division) teams, including Club Toluca, Santos Laguna, CF Atlas, UANL, and Tecos UAG.

He was signed by Chivas USA on 11 March 2009, then on trial bases with the Los Angeles-based club throughout its 2009 pre-season. Lillingston went on a short-term loan deal with Mexican club Club Tijuana in January, 2010.

International
Lillingston has represented Mexico at various youth levels. He was a member of Mexico U-20 National team at the 1997 FIFA World Youth Championship in Malaysia, leading his team with three goals in four matches during the tournament.

Honours
Toluca
 Primera División de México: Verano 1998

References

External links

1977 births
Living people
Association football forwards
Mexican people of English descent
Footballers from Guadalajara, Jalisco
Deportivo Toluca F.C. players
Santos Laguna footballers
Atlas F.C. footballers
Tigres UANL footballers
Tecos F.C. footballers
Chivas USA players
Club Tijuana footballers
Indios de Ciudad Juárez footballers
Mexican expatriate footballers
Mexican footballers
Expatriate soccer players in the United States
Liga MX players
Major League Soccer players
Mexico youth international footballers
Mexico under-20 international footballers